Bekeshevo (Bikeş) is a rural locality (a selo) in Novopetrovsky Selsoviet, Kugarchinsky District, Bashkortostan, Russia. The population was 192 as of 2010. There are 2 streets.

Geography 
Bekeshevo is located 17 km southwest of Mrakovo (the district's administrative centre) by road. Saitkulovo is the nearest rural locality.

References 

Rural localities in Kugarchinsky District